Sherman is a village in the town of Sherman, Chautauqua County, New York, United States. The village lies in the northern part of the town at intersections of County Routes 15 and 18, NY-76 and NY-430. The population was 681 at the 2020 census.

History 
The village of Sherman was incorporated in 1890. Sherman was named for Roger Sherman, a signer of the Declaration of Independence. The first settler was Dearing Dorman. A granite monument exists at the site of his original settlement on what is now known as Titus Road.

Geography

Sherman is the westernmost incorporated place in New York.

Demographics

As of the census of 2000, there were 714 people, 287 households, and 198 families residing in the village. The population density was 860.4 people per square mile (332.1/km2). There were 316 housing units at an average density of 380.8 per square mile (147.0/km2). The racial makeup of the village was 97.90% White, 0.28% Native American, 0.42% Asian, and 1.40% from two or more races. Hispanic or Latino of any race were 0.42% of the population.

There were 287 households, out of which 34.1% had children under the age of 18 living with them, 53.0% were married couples living together, 12.2% had a female householder with no husband present, and 30.7% were non-families. 27.2% of all households were made up of individuals, and 16.0% had someone living alone who was 65 years of age or older. The average household size was 2.48 and the average family size was 2.99.

In the village, the population was spread out, with 26.6% under the age of 18, 9.4% from 18 to 24, 25.2% from 25 to 44, 24.4% from 45 to 64, and 14.4% who were 65 years of age or older. The median age was 37 years. For every 100 females, there were 93.5 males. For every 100 females age 18 and over, there were 88.5 males.

The median income for a household in the village was $30,583, and the median income for a family was $37,857. Males had a median income of $26,645 versus $20,833 for females. The per capita income for the village was $15,266. About 7.2% of families and 10.6% of the population were below the poverty line, including 14.7% of those under age 18 and 7.8% of those age 65 or over.

Schools
Sherman has only one school, Sherman Central School, covering pre-school grades through grade 12. There are about 550 enrolled students in total, with an approximate graduating class of 40 students, and an attendance rate of 97%. The student ethnicity is 99% White/non-Hispanic, and 1% Black/non-Hispanic. The average student / teacher ratio is 14:1, and the average years of experience for the teachers is 13 years.

References

External links
 Town and Village of Sherman official website

Villages in New York (state)
Villages in Chautauqua County, New York